The  is one of the two main railway lines of Japanese private railway company Nankai Electric Railway, together with Kōya Line. The route is from Namba Station in south downtown of Osaka to Wakayamashi Station in Wakayama via Sakai, Izumiōtsu, Kishiwada, Kaizuka, Izumisano, Sennan, Hannan and Misaki municipalities. The proper name is with the company's name, "the Nankai Main Line", not simply "the Main Line" often seen in other Japanese private railways. Lines of the Nankai Main Lane and the connecting lines excluded the Kōya Line and the Airport Line are named generically "". The line is shown with a pictogram of waves, or distinguished with blue from conifer or green Kōya Line.

Route data
Line length: 
Track: quadruple from Namba to Suminoe (to Kishinosato-Tamade, eastern two tracks are for Kōya Line exclusively), double from Suminoe to Wakayamashi

Service types
Nankai and Kintetsu are the only two private railway operators in Kansai that offer charged Limited Express trains.

Limited express trains named "Southern" are operated between Namba and Wakayamashi or Wakayamakō. They are operated with 8-car formations and 4 cars of 8 are charged for seat reservation. Trains to and from Wakayamakō connect to Nankai Ferry services to and from the Shikoku region.

Airport limited express trains named "Rapi:t" are operated between Namba and Kansai Airport and exclusively with 50000 series 6-car formations. All cars are charged for seat reservation. Rapi:t α trains stop at only stations marked with S, and Rapi:t β trains at stations marked with S and S*. They have been operated since Kansai International Airport opened in 1994.

Express trains are operated between Namba and Wakayamashi or Wakayamakō before 10 a.m. and after 4 p.m. on weekdays and in morning on Saturdays, Sundays, Holidays, and pass Haruki Station. They are operated with 6 or 8-car formations. The fourth car of 8-car trains for Namba is only for women in the morning until arriving at Tengachaya by 8:30 a.m. on weekdays.
Before November 26, 2005, operated all day, two per hour from 10 a.m. to 4 p.m.

Airport express trains are operated between Namba and Kansai Airport all day and stop at Haruki. 4 trains are operated per direction per hour from 10 a.m. until 4 p.m. They are operated with 6 or 8-car formations. The fourth car of 8-car trains for Namba is only for women in the morning until arriving at Tengachaya by 8:30 a.m. on weekdays.

Sub express trains are operated between Namba and Hagurazaki, Misakikoen or Wakayamashi in the morning, evening, and night. They stop at airport express stations between Namba and Izumisano, and every station between Izumisano and Wakayamashi. Namba-bound trains are operated every morning and weekday rush hours in the evening.

Semi-express trains are operated from Hagurazaki or Haruki to Namba only on weekday mornings.

 Local trains are operated between Namba and Wakayamashi all day. They also return to Namba at Hagurazaki, Tarui, Misakikōen or Kansai Airport in the rush hours and midnight. Only 1 northbound train is operated from Wakayamashi to Hagurazaki in the midnight. Trains pass Imamiyaebisu and Haginochaya stations due to absence of platforms on the tracks of the Nankai Line. Those stations are served by local trains of the Kōya Line.
In Japanese railway operation, "Futsū" (literally "ordinary, normal") and "Kakueki Teisha" (literally "train that stops at every station", "Kakutei" for short) are used interchangeably for trains that stop at every station. On the Nankai Railway alone, however, the two words are used for different classes of train. The former is for Locals of Nankai Main Line that do not stop at the above two stations, while the latter is for Kōya Line trains that do stop there, true to the meaning of the Japanese name of the service class.

Stations

Main Line
● : Trains stop.
▲: Rapi:t α trains pass, β trains stop.
▼: At Haruki, Express trains marked with a white line makes a stop
◆: Trains stop in the off-peak hours from January 1 until 3 every year.
｜ ↑: All trains pass (Arrows indicate directions)
Wakayamadaigakumae became one of the Southern stations on October 18, 2014.

Tennoji Branch Line
Listed counterclockwise: All stations are in the city of Osaka, Osaka Prefecture.

Rolling stock

9000 series exclusively for Southern (non-reserved car)
8300 series (from Autumn 2015) exclusively for Southern (non-reserved car, from December 2020)
8000 series exclusively for Southern (non-reserved car)
7100 series exclusively for Southern (non-reserved car)
7000 series (until October 2015)
2000 series
1000 series
10000 series exclusively for Southern (reserved car)
12000 series exclusively for Southern (reserved car)
50000 series exclusively for rapi:t
3000 series
Semboku 5000 series
Semboku 7000 series
Semboku 7020 series

History
The line was extended to Sakai in 1888, and the Namba - Sumiyoshitaisha section was duplicated in 1892.

In 1897 the then separate Nankai Railway opened the Sakai - Sano (present-day Izumisano) section as 1067mm gauge, with the Namba - Sano section regauged to match, and the Sumiyoshitaisha - Sano section duplicated the same year. The following year the Hankai Co. merged with Nankai Railway, and the line was extended to Wakayama. The present line to Wakayamashi was completed in 1903, and in 1906 the first dining car on a private railway in Japan was introduced on the Wakayama express.

The duplication of the line extended to Hamaderakoen in 1907, Kaizuka in 1911, Takako in 1915 and to Wakayama in 1922.

Electrification at 600 VDC began in 1907 on the section from Namba to Hamaderakōen, and was completed in 1911. The voltage was increased to 1500 VDC in 1973.

Former connecting lines
 Tengachaya station - A 2 km line to Tennoji opened in 1900. In 1933 the line was electrified at 1500 VDC, the line closing in 1984.
 Sakai station - A 2 km 1435mm gauge line from Shukuin to Ohama, electrified at 600 VDC, opened by the BanSakai Electric Railway Co. in 1912 (and acquired by Nankai in 1914) connected at this station until closed in 1949.
 Wakayama station - A 3 km line to Higashi-Matsue on the Nankai Kada Line opened in 1912. The line was electrified at 600 VDC in 1930, and closed in 1955.

References
This article incorporates material from the corresponding article in the Japanese Wikipedia

Lines of Nankai Electric Railway
Rail transport in Osaka Prefecture
Rail transport in Wakayama Prefecture
Railway lines opened in 1885
1067 mm gauge railways in Japan
2 ft 9 in gauge railways